Oostoever is a neighborhood of Amsterdam, Netherlands.

Street names
The streets in the neighborhood are named after the following museums (though mostly Dutch, some are in other countries): 

Amsterdam Nieuw-West
Neighbourhoods of Amsterdam